Maryland House of Delegates District 2A is one of the 67 districts that compose the Maryland House of Delegates. Along with subdistrict 2B, it makes up the 2nd district of the Maryland Senate. District 2A includes part of Washington County, and is represented by two delegates.

Demographic characteristics
As of the 2020 United States census, the district had a population of 91,587, of whom 73,136 (79.9%) were of voting age. The racial makeup of the district was 72,911 (79.6%) White, 8,386 (9.2%) African American, 262 (0.3%) Native American, 1,884 (2.1%) Asian, 25 (0.0%) Pacific Islander, 2,392 (2.6%) from some other race, and 5,700 (6.2%) from two or more races. Hispanic or Latino of any race were 5,444 (5.9%) of the population.

The district had 60,615 registered voters as of October 17, 2020, of whom 12,218 (20.2%) were registered as unaffiliated, 29,230 (48.2%) were registered as Republicans, 18,279 (30.2%) were registered as Democrats, and 496 (0.8%) were registered to other parties.

Past Election Results

1982

1998

2002

2006

2010

2014

2018

References

2A